The Revolt of the Polkos was a coup d'état, launched on February 27, 1847, during the Mexican-American War, by the militias stationed at the capital, with the aim of overthrowing President Valentin Gomez Farias. It would eventually succeed and Valentin Gomez Farias was replaced by Pedro María de Anaya. 

This was the second successful coup that Mexico experienced during the Mexican-American War and Gomez Farias himself had ascended to the presidency in the aftermath of the fall of President Mariano Paredes, who was overthrown in August, 1846, for his poor handling of the war. This was also the second non-consecutive, time that Gomez Farias was serving as President of Mexico. He had previously been president in 1833 during which he had attempted to pass many anti-clerical measures. 

As the government was struggling to finance the war, the Gomez Farias administration in January, 1847 decided upon nationalizing church lands and selling them to the amount of fifteen million pesos. The measure was met with difficulties and controversy, with conservatives fearing the revival of the 1833 anti-clerical campaign, and moderate liberals questioning the effectiveness of such a controversial decree. Violent resistance throughout the country began in January, but it was not until February 27th, that the Revolt of the Polkos broke out in the capital. Polkos was a term used to refer to the middle class professionals that made up the militias involved in the revolt. 

Meanwhile Santa Anna was returning to Mexico City from the Battle of Buena Vista to focus on Winfield Scott's expedition at Veracruz. He received news of the revolt en route, and eventually took the role of arbitrator, siding with the rebels and deposing Gomez Farias.

Background
The Mexican American War began under the presidency of Mariano Paredes, who after suffering catastrophic losses throughout the north of the country and ending with American troops under Zachary Taylor, ensconced as far as Saltillo, was overthrown in August, 1846. Jose Mariano Salas became interim president.

He also engaged in constitutional reform, restoring the federalist Constitution of 1824, after a decade of crises culminating in the war had discredited the Centralist Republic of Mexico, and lead to a resurgence of support for the old constitution. The former dictator Santa Anna proclaimed his support for the federal system and was invited back into the country to help the war effort. New presidential elections were held in December, 1846, and would be won by Santa Anna and Valentin Gomez Farias who would precede to share power. Both men had already ruled together in 1833 during which a controversial anti-clerical campaign had been carried out, culminating in Santa Anna switching sides and overthrowing Gomez Farias. 

The government was struggling to finance the war, a problem made worse by corruption in the finance ministry, which did not inspire confidence when the government proposed an audit of property owners.  On January 7, 1847, a measure was introduced to congress signed by four of five members of a financial ministry commission, endorsing the seizure of fifteen million pesos from the church by nationalizing and then selling its lands, which in turn alarmed Gomez Farias’ opponents into fearing that he was reviving the anti-clerical campaign of 1833. 

The decree was signed by the president of congress Pedro María de Anaya, and Gomez Farias approved it with the support of finance minister Zubieta. The latter was given instructions to avoid any fraud, or hiding of wealth that would impede the efficacy of the measure. Tenants on church lands were to be fined if they did not hand over their rent to government agents instead of the church.  Minister of Relations José Fernando Ramírez recommended that application of the relevant Indian laws in anticipation of political agitation in the churches. Minister of War Valentin Canalizo urged the utmost severity in enforcing laws against those upsetting the public order.  

Local opposition to the decree was more marked. The legislatures of Queretaro, Puebla, and Guanajuato petitioned congress to nullify the decree. , The State of Durango refused to enforce it, and the State of Queretaro proposed an alternative plan to fund the war effort.  Tenants who lived on church lands were also resistant to the enforcement of the decree.  

The liberal paper El Monitor Republicano was incredulous that amidst all available options for raising funds, the government had chosen to nationalize church lands in the middle of a war, without sounding public opinion, and reminded its readers that the last time Gomez Farias tried to nationalize church lands in 1833 it ended with the overthrow of the liberal government. 

Minister of Relations Ramirez resigned after clashes with the cabinet, including difficulties in finding buyers of church lands.  On January 26, President Gomez Farias named a junta charged with carrying out the sales of church lands.  The legal secretaries Cuevas and Mendez were fined for not wishing to participate.  A measure was taken to audit the finance ministry to reduce corruption in general and the relevant officials were also obliged to present a report every four days on the progress of the church land sales and to explain any factors that were causing any delays.  

There were demonstrations in the capital as early as January 15th, but the government was obstinate in carrying out its policy of nationalizing church lands.  The Oaxaca garrison pronounced against the government on February 21.  Mazatlan followed, and much as when there had been revolts against the first presidency of Gomez Farias, the rebels began to call for Santa Anna with whom Gomez Farias was sharing power, to take over the government.  

Meanwhile, peaceful opposition against the nationalization law continued. Liberal Deputy Mariano Otero protested against the measure, and the new finance minister José Luis Huici refused to sign it.

Rebellion
Sensing that members of the newly formed national guard at the capital were not sympathetic to the government. Valentin Gomez Farias tried to move them to locations where they would not be a threat to  the government. He intended to move the Independence Battalion, away from the University of Mexico located next to the National Palace. He sent on February 24, troops led by his own son to expel the Independence Battalion from their temporary barracks. The battalion was a militia  made up of middle class professionals, and their expulsion from the city threatened the livelihoods of their families.  This resulted in protest and outrage, followed by the arrest of certain members of the Independence Battalion.  

On February 27, five national guard battalions proclaimed against the government. They released a manifesto excoriating the government for pursuing a divisive policy instead of uniting the country in the war effort and seeking a means of funding the military that was backed by national consensus.  This came to be known as the Revolt of the Polkos, because the young middle-class men who made up the militias stationed throughout the capital were known for dancing the polka.  The rebels were joined by General José Mariano Salas, who had already played a role during the war of overthrowing President Mariano Paredes. General Matías de la Peña Barragán chief of the rebels met with Valentin Canalizo on February 30 and they negotiated on the matter of an arrangement, with Pena insisting on the deposition of Gomez Farias. The negotiations came to nothing and the revolt continued.  

Meanwhile news arrived that Santa Anna had won the Battle of Buena Vista which took place on February 22 to February 23, and which in reality had been a draw. Santa Anna was heading back to Mexico City to arrange defenses against the forces of Winfield Scott who had just landed at Veracruz. He was at the town of Matehuala on the way from Angostura to San Luis Potosi, when received news that there had been a revolution against the government of Valentin Gomez Farias.  

Upon arrival in San Luis Potosi on March 10, he wrote two letters one to Gomez Farias and one to Peña Barragán ordering them both to suspend hostilities, which they did so, awaiting the arrival and arbitration of Santa Anna  On his way to the capital he was met by representatives from both sides of the conflict hoping to sway him to their cause.  On March 21 representatives of the congress including Mariano Otero, José María Lafragua, and others, set out to present Santa Anna with an offer to assume the presidency. He continued receiving representatives of various interests and was congratulated for his ‘victory' at Buena Vista. Ignacio Trigueros was named new governor of the federal district and Pedro María de Anaya was named the new commandant general. 

In the peace settlement, Congress abolished the office of vice president, thereby removing Gómez Farías from office, and named Pedro María de Anaya as the new president.

References

Further reading
 Conway, Christopher, and Gustavo Pellon. The U.S.-Mexican War: A Binational Reader. Hackett Publishing, 2010, 116.
 Costeloe, Michael P. "The Mexican Church and the Rebellion of the Polkos." The Hispanic American Historical Review 46, no. 2 (May 1, 1966): 170–178.
Fowler, Will. Santa Anna of Mexico. Lincoln: University of Nebraska Press 2007.
 Frazier, Donald. The United States and Mexico at War: Nineteenth-Century Expansionism and Conflict. New York: Macmillan Reference USA, 1998, 329.
 Heidler, David Stephen, and Jeanne T. Heidler. The Mexican War. Greenwood Publishing Group, 2006, 113-115.
 Howe, Daniel Walker. What Hath God Wrought: The Transformation of America, 1815–1848. New York: Oxford University Press US, 2007, 781–782.
 MacLachlan, Colin M., and William H. Beezley. Mexico's Crucial Century, 1810–1910: An Introduction. Lincoln, NE: University of Nebraska Press, 2011, 62–74.
 Santoni, Pedro. Mexicans at Arms: Puro Federalists and the Politics of War, 1845–1848. Fort Worth: Texas Christian University Press, 1996, 182–195.

External links
 Divisions in Mexico - PBS U.S.-Mexican War
 The Polkos Revolt - A Continent Divided: The U.S.-Mexico War 

Monterrey
Presidency of James K. Polk
Rebellions in Mexico
1847 in the Mexican-American War
Religiously motivated violence in Mexico
History of Catholicism in Mexico
Polkos